The Singles is a compilation album of singles and B-sides by the German experimental rock band Can, released in 2017.

Critical reception
The Quietus wrote that "as a collection that welcomes the near misses and the questionable latter-era caricaturing, The Singles is real and admirable testament to the full Can story."

Track listing

References 

2017 compilation albums
Can (band) albums
United Artists Records compilation albums